Edward L. Beck, C.P. is an author, journalist, and Catholic priest of the Passionist congregation. He is an on-air contributor for CNN on issues of faith, religion and ethics, and has written three books. 

Prior to working at CNN, he was a media contributor for ABC News, CBS News, Fox News, HLN and MSNBC. He co-hosted Focus on Faith with Chris Cuomo for ABC News from 2009 to 2014. Beck also leads retreats and workshops on spirituality. He lives in New York City.

Books published as author
 God Underneath: Spiritual Memoirs of a Catholic Priest, Doubleday, 2001. 
 Unlikely Ways Home: Real-Life Spiritual Detours, Doubleday, 2004. 
 Soul Provider: Spiritual Steps to Limitless Love, Doubleday, 2007.

As a playwright
Beck also wrote a play, Sweetened Water, which had a staged reading starring Vanessa Williams and Amy Brenneman at Playwrights Horizons theater in New York City in January 2015 and an Equity production in the summer of 2015 at Martha's Vineyard Playhouse in Vineyard Haven, Massachusetts.
Subsequent readings featured Laila Robins, Josh Lucas, Sean Cullen, Nathan Darrow, Tricia Paoluccio and Meghann Fahy.

References

Passionists
American male dramatists and playwrights
American male journalists
American religious writers
American Roman Catholic priests
Living people
Year of birth missing (living people)